John Hoge served in the Pennsylvania Senate in 1851. He was a Democrat who represented District 19, which at the time included the counties of Mercer, Venango, and Warren. His son Thomas Hoge succeeded him. John Hoge and his wife Mary Irwin were of Irish descent.

References

Year of death missing
Year of birth missing
Democratic Party Pennsylvania state senators
19th-century American politicians
American people of Irish descent